This is the discography of Xzibit, an American rapper.

Albums

Studio albums

Compilation albums

Bootleg albums

Mixtapes

Video albums

Singles

As lead artist

As featured artist

Promotional singles

Other charted songs

Guest appearances

Videography
 1996: "Paparazzi" (directed by Michael Lucero)
 1996: "The Foundation" (directed by Michael Lucero)
 1998: "What U See Is What U Get" (directed by Gregory Dark)
 1999: "Up From da Underground" (featuring KRS-One & Xzibit) (directed by Atom Rothlein)
 1999: "Bitch Please" (Snoop Dogg featuring Xzibit & Nate Dogg) (directed by Dr. Dre & Phillip Atwell)
 1999: "The Game Don't Wait (Remix)" (Warren G featuring Snoop Dogg, Nate Dogg and Xzibit) (directed by Mark Gerard)
 1999: "Still D.R.E." (Dr.Dre featuring Snoop Dogg)
 2000: "Year 2000" (directed by Philip G. Atwell &  Xzibit )
 2000: "Front 2 Back" (directed by Diane Martel)
 2000: "X" (directed by David Meyers)
 2001: "Get Your Walk On"(directed by Smith 'N' Borin')
 2001: "Purple Hills" (D12)
 2001: "Bad Boy For Life" (Diddy and the Bad Boy Family)
 2002: "Multiply" (directed by Chris Robinson)
 2002: "Symphony In X Major" (directed by Joe Hahn)
 2003: "In Da Club" (50 Cent)
 2004: "Ride & Smoke"
 2004: "Hey Now (Mean Muggin)" (directed by Benny Boom)
 2005: "Criminal Set" (directed by Estevan Oriol)
 2006: "Concentrate" (directed by Little X)
 2006: "Roll On 'Em" (DJ Crazy Toones featuring WC, Young Maylay, MC Ren & Xzibit) (directed by D. Baker)
 2008: "Thank You"
 2008: My life by The Game feat lil Wayne
 2009: "Figure It Out" (Young De featuring Xzibit and Mykestro)
 2009: "Forever" (Drake featuring Kanye West, Lil Wayne and Eminem)
 2009: "It Ain't Nothin'" (Cypress Hill)
 2009: "Respect My Conglomerate" (Busta Rhymes featuring Lil Wayne and Jadakiss)
 2010: "Phenom"
 2010: "Goin' Back" (Statik Selektah & Termanology featuring Cassidy and Xzibit)
 2010: "Hurt Locker"
 2011: "What It Is"
 2011: "Man on the Moon"
 2011: "Off The Handle" (Adil Omar featuring Xzibit)
 2012: "I Don't Dance" (DMX featuring Machine Gun Kelly)
 2014: "And We Run" (Within Temptation featuring Xzibit)
 2015: "juice"  by AD

References

Hip hop discographies
Discographies of American artists